Donald Elder (1913-1956) was an American author and editor. He edited Doubleday, Doran and Co. and was also the author of Ring Lardner, A Biography, which details the life of the great humorist from Niles, Michigan.

References

1913 births
1956 deaths
20th-century American biographers
20th-century American male writers
American male non-fiction writers